Hyblaea erycinoides is a moth in the family Hyblaeidae described by Francis Walker in 1858.

References

Hyblaeidae